Tunkalilla is a locality in the Australian state of South Australia located on the south coast of the Fleurieu Peninsula overlooking Backstairs Passage about  south of the state capital of  Adelaide.

Tunkalilla’s boundaries were created in August 1999 along with the selection of its name which is derived from prior uses of the name for features such as a creek, a beach and a homestead.

As of 2015, the principal land use within the locality is primary production uses such as agriculture.  A secondary land use is conservation which includes the protected area known as the Eric Bonython Conservation Park and the coastline overlooking Backstairs Passage.

Tunkalilla is located within the federal division of Mayo, the state electoral district of Mawson and the local government area of the District Council of Yankalilla.

References

Towns in South Australia
Fleurieu Peninsula